Chelsia Ng is an actress from Malaysia.

Biography
Kuala Lumpur-born Ng made her first step in the entertainment scene in the Malaysian English-language comedy Kopitiam as Rain, an assistant in Steven's (Lim) salon.

Besides Kopitiam, she was part of local teochew sitcom Homecoming as well as being a member of the supporting cast of Tin Geok Bin.

Ng had a role in the film Salon in 2005, for which she was left a nomination for Best Supporting Actress in the 19th Malaysia Film Festival the following year.

In 2006 Ng returned to television by playing Melody in Realiti. In 2008, she starred in Ghost and Ampang Medikal. Later on in 2009, she played the role of Yvonne who is the best friend of Miasara (Liyana Jasmay) in Afdlin Shauki's "Papadom".

Filmography 
 2022: Kudeta
 2021: Sa Balik Baju
 2019: Babi!
 2017: You Mean the World to Me
 2017: J Revolusi
 2014: Gila Baby
 2013: Papadom 2
 2013: Tanda Putera
 2012: Small Mission Enterprise (SME) 
 2011: Vote!
 2011: Appalam
 2009: Papadom
 2009: Setem
 2008: Sepi
 2005: Salon
 2003: Kopitiam (TV Series)

References

External links
Sinema Malaysia profile (Malay)

1981 births
Living people
Malaysian actresses
Malaysian people of Chinese descent
Malaysian television personalities
People from Penang